Metsimaholo Local Municipality is an administrative area in the Fezile Dabi District of the Free State in South Africa. "Metsimaholo" means "big water" in Sesotho.

Main places
The 2001 census divided the municipality into the following main places:

Politics 

The municipal council consists of forty-six members elected by mixed-member proportional representation. Twenty-three councillors are elected by first-past-the-post voting in twenty-three wards, while the remaining twenty-three are chosen from party lists so that the total number of party representatives is proportional to the number of votes received.

In the election of 1 November 2021, no party won a majority on the council. The Economic Freedom Fighters (EFF) formed a coalition with the African National Congress (ANC). The EFF's Selloane Motjeane was elected mayor, while Lucas Fisher of the ANC was elected Speaker and Fikile Msokweni of the ANC the Council Whip. 

The following table shows the results of the 2021 election.

References

External links
 Official website

Local municipalities of the Fezile Dabi District Municipality